Marko Rantanen (born February 28, 1975) is a Finnish former ice hockey goaltender.

Rantanen played in the SM-liiga for Jokerit and KalPa, playing seventeen games for each team. He also played in the French Élite Ligue for LHC Les Lions, the British Ice Hockey Superleague for the Newcastle Riverkings and the Norwegian Eliteserien for Vålerenga Ishockey.

Rantanen represented his country in junior level, including the 1993 IIHF European U18 Championship.

References

External links

1975 births
Living people
IF Björklöven players
Finnish ice hockey goaltenders
Jokerit players
KalPa players
LHC Les Lions players
Newcastle Riverkings players
Sportspeople from Espoo
Vålerenga Ishockey players